Kauppakeskus Viiri is a shopping mall in the southeast part of Klaukkala, Finland. It is the largest shopping centre in the Nurmijärvi municipality.

The mall is divided into Big Viiri (Isoviiri) and Little Viiri (Pikkuviiri). In the spring, the Viiri Fair (Viirin Messut) is held annually in the shopping center. The fair has companies from the shopping center, as well as other stakeholders and sports clubs.

An extension, including a Prisma hypermarket, and a new market were planned for the mall. These were to be realized with the construction of the Viirinlaakso area, but HOK-Elanto withdrew from the project and moved Klaukkala's old S-market to a nearby retail space.

Stores

Big Viiri
K-Citymarket
Alko
Euronics/Klaukkalan Pörssi
Kultajousi
Klaukkalan Apteekki
Mandy Fashion
Huoltopulssi
Hieronta Lehto
Kiinteistömaailma
Keto-Orvokki
Nahkari
Valokuvaamo Vanhatalo
Viirinhius
Pussukka
Fit24 Express

Restaurants and cafés
Cafe Viiri, a coffeehouse
Ararat, pizzeria and restaurant
Yang's, restaurant

Little Viiri
Team Sportia, a sports equipment store
Klaukkalan ja Uudenmaan ajo-opisto, a driving school

References

Lähde
Viiri